Rose Oldfield Hayes was an American anthropologist at the State University of New York, Buffalo. After doing fieldwork in Sudan in 1970 interviewing women who had been infibulated, Hayes wrote the first scholarly paper on female genital mutilation (FGM) that used that term, and the first to incorporate information from the women themselves. Published in American Ethnologist in 1975, the paper represented an important step forward in understanding the practice.

Selected works

References

20th-century American writers
Activists against female genital mutilation
University at Buffalo faculty
Possibly living people
Year of birth missing
American anthropologists